Kumaran is name of a place in Dhaka Division, Bangladesh.

References

Populated places in Dhaka Division